Chin chin is a fried snack from Nigeria, it is known as atchomon in Togo and Benin, achomo in Ghana, and croquette in Cameroon.

It is similar to the Scandinavian snack klenat, a crunchy, donut-like baked or fried dough of wheat flour, and other customary baking items. Chin chin may contain cowpeas. Many people bake it with ground nutmeg for flavor. 

The dough is usually kneaded and cut into small one-inch (or so) squares, about a quarter of an inch thick, before frying.

Ingredients 
Chin chin is made of dough containing flour, sugar, butter, and milk. Optional ingredients include eggs, sugar and baking powder according to individual preference. The dough is cut into various shapes and sizes then typically deep fried in vegetable oil.

Origin of Chin Chin

Chin Chin seems to derive from an ancient Cantonese greeting (qǐng qǐng – 请请). This expression became popular among European merchants, who transcribed it as chin chin. The Italians liked it a lot because it reminded them of the sound of clinking glasses, and they adopted it as a toast.

Although there are no good documentations on the history of Chin-Chin, most West African kids grew up eating and making Chin-Chin (as opposed to cookies) with their “mummy” or relatives. So think about Chin-Chin as the equivalent of cookies but in small bite sizes and with louder flavors.

Nutritional Value 

Chin-Chin can serve as an energy booster, it is also a source of vitamins like A, B3, and D.

Gallery

See also
BeeRain Chin Chin

References

Doughnuts
Snack foods